Lieutenant-General Sir George Augustus Quentin (1760–1851)  was a Hanoverian British Army officer who fought in the Napoleonic Wars.

Biography
George Quentin was born in 1760, and was the eldest  son of George Quentin of Göttingen.

Quentin served seven years in the Hanoverian Garde du Corps, prior to entering the British Army. He was appointed cornet in the 10th Light Dragoons in 1793. Subsequent promotions followed to lieutenant (1October 1794); captain (17May 1796); major (14February 1805) and Lieutenant-Colonel on 13October 1808. He served in the Peninsular War under Sir John Moore from 11November 1808 to 16June 1809, at the battles of Benavente and Corunna; also in Spain, under the Duke of Wellington, in 1813 and 1814, where he received a gold medal and one clasp for his conduct in command of the 10th Hussars at the battles of Orthes and the Toulouse. He received the brevet rank of Colonel on 4June 1814 and in 1815 served under Wellington in Flanders, and at Waterloo, where he was severely wounded. He was promoted to lieutenant-general in 1838. 

At Waterloo in 1815 he was badly wounded, and created Companion of the Order of the Bath (CB) later that year. He was created Knight Commander of the Royal Guelphic Order in 1821. He was aide-de-camp to the Prince Regent from 1811 to 1825, when he was appointed Equerry to the Crown Stables. He died on 7December 1851, aged 91.

Court Martial
On 17October 1814, Quentin was court-martialed on multiple counts of dereliction of duty during the Peninsular War. At the trial it became apparent that the charges had been invented by the officers of his regiment in retaliation for Quentin's attempt to impose discipline on the "aristocratic rabble" under his command.
The trial lasted two weeks at the end of which the court decided that Quentin should "be reprimanded in such manner as his Royal Highness the Commander in Chief shall be pleased to direct."

Family

In 1811, Quentin married Georgiana (died 1853), the youngest daughter of James Lawrell of Eastwick Park, and of Frimley Park, Surrey. She was reputedly unfaithful to her husband, and became celebrated as a royal mistress, under the names "Mrs Quentin" or "Harriet Quentin" (a misnomer). In 1822, a pamphlet appeared, Memoirs of the Celebrated Mrs Q—– by "Edward Eglantine", a pseudonym of William Benbow. It was reprinted in 1906 in Mrs Q—— and "Windsor Castle", with plates, by the collector Joseph Grego.

Their son, George Augustus Quentin, a major of the 10th Hussars, married in 1845 Anne Medlycott, daughter of the Rev. John Thomas Medlycott, of Rockets Castle, Waterford. Their daughter, Augusta Laurell (or Lawrell), married, in 1848, Captain Charles Francis Compton, formerly of the Madras Army, 48th regiment.

Notes

References

Attribution

Further reading

1760 births
1851 deaths
British Army commanders of the Napoleonic Wars
Companions of the Order of the Bath